Theoprosopon is the Greek name of Lithoprosopon, a cape in north Lebanon, also known today by the name of Râs ach-Chaq’a’. The cape is situated between the ancient cities of Batroun and Tripoli.  The promontory creates a massive barrier that cuts through the coast of Lebanon, making it impossible for travelers to circumvent.  Today's modern, coastal highway runs through two tunnels.

History
During Antiquity, a road that ran parallel to the sea existed, which made it possible to circumvent Cape Lithoprosopon and to connect Batroun to Tripoli. Historians report that the earthquake of 551 A.D. caused a landslide, causing the road to sink into the sea permanently, and thus isolating Tripoli from Batroun and Byblos.

The name of the cape changed throughout history.  The oldest mention of the promontory appears in the writings of the Greek historian, Polybius who named it “Theou Prosopon” or “Face of God.” The Greek geographers, Ptolemy and Strabon, also mentioned it under the name of Theouprosopon. Pomponius, the Roman geographer, called it “Promontorium Euprosopon” or “Cape of the Good Face.” The name, Lithoprosopon, did not come to usage until the time of the Byzantine Empire when the area was completely Christianized and the name of the cape was changed from “Face of God”, to Lithoprosopon or “Face of Stone.”  Aramaic and Syriac historians translated it to  “Parsuph Kipa” and later on Arab historians translated it to “Anf Al-Hajar” and “Wajh Al-Hajar" or “Nose or Face of Stone.” The historians of the Crusades called it “Pew of the Constable” and “Mount of the General.” At the times of the Mamluks and Ottomans, the cape's named reverted to its Arabic name of “Wajh Al-Hajar.”

The French historian, Laurent d'Arvieux, wrote in 1660 that the Franks named it Cape Rouge, a corruption of the Lebanese Arabic word wež, which means “face.” Jean de La Roque, in 1688, gave the cape two additional names, Capo Pagro and Cappouge. Cappouge was probably a corruption of "Cap Rouge". Cappouge could also come from “Capo poggio” or “Cape of the Hill or of the Monticule”, which matches the current name of the cape, Râs ech-Chaq'a', which means “Cape of the Stone Monticule.” The stone monticule probably referred to the Greek Orthodox monastery of Our Lady of the Light that was built at that time.

Modern tourist attraction
The cape today is home to several seaside resorts.  It is also a popular Christian pilgrimage site where believers visit the shrine and monastery of Our Lady of Nourieh, located in the village of Hamat.

Wetlands
There is a  wetlands refuge here at the Deir el Nouriyeh cliffs of Ras Chekaa, listed in the list of wetlands of international importance under the Ramsar Convention.

References

Landforms of Lebanon
Ramsar sites in Lebanon
Headlands of Asia